Podocarpus gibbsii is a species of conifer in the family Podocarpaceae. It is found only in Malaysia. It is threatened by habitat loss.

References

gibbsii
Vulnerable plants
Taxonomy articles created by Polbot
Taxobox binomials not recognized by IUCN